Al Perkins (1904–1975) was the writer of several children's books, including Hand, Hand, Fingers, Thumb, The Digging-est Dog, and The Ear Book. He also wrote early titles in the Beginner Books and Bright and Early Books series.

Bibliography 
 Don and Donna Go to Bat (Beginner Books, 1966) — illustrated by B. Tobey - His first work.
 The Digging-est Dog (Beginner Books, 1967) — illustrated by Eric Gurney
 Hugh Lofting's Travels of Doctor Dolittle (Beginner Books, 1967) — illustrated by Philip Wende
 Meet Doctor Dolittle (Random House, 1967) - illustrated by Lean Jason
 High Lofting's Doctor Dolittle and the Pirates (Beginner Books, 1968) — illustrated by Philip Wende
 Ian Fleming's Story of Chitty Chitty Bang Bang (Beginner Books, 1968) - illustrated by B. Tobey
 Meet Chitty Chitty Bang Bang, the Wonderful Magical Car! (Random House, 1968) — illustrated by John Hanna
 The Ear Book (Bright and Early Books/Bright and Early Board Books, 1968/2007) — illustrated by William O'Brian/Henry Payne
 King Midas and the Golden Touch (Beginner Books/Scholastic, 1969/1973) — illustrated by Harold Berson/Haig and Regina Shekerjian
 Hand, Hand, Fingers, Thumb (Bright and Early Books/Bright and Early Board Books/Big Bright and Early Board Books, 1969) — illustrated by Eric Gurney
 The Nose Book (Bright and Early Books/Bright and Early Board Books/Big Bright and Early Board Books, 1970/2002) — illustrated by Roy McKie/Joe Mathieu 
 Tubby and the Lantern (Beginner Books, 1971) — illustrated by Rowland B. Wilson
 Tubby and the Poo-Bah (Beginner Books, 1972) — illustrated by Rowland B. Wilson - His final work before his death.
 The Big Red Book of Beginner Books (Beginner Books, 1995) - with Joan Heilbroner, Marlin Sadler, Mike McClintock, P.D. Eastman and Robert Lopshire, illustrated by Robert Lopshire, P.D. Eastman, Eric Gurney, Roger Bollen and Fritz Seibel
 My Big Book of Beginner Books about Me (Beginner Books, 2011) - with Dr. Seuss and Graham Tether, illustrated by Dr. Seuss, Joe Mathieu and Sylvie Wickstrom
 The Big Aqua Book of Beginner Books (Beginner Books, 2017) - with Dr. Seuss and Robert Lopshire, illustrated by Eric Gurney, Dr. Seuss, Art Cummings and Robert Lopshire - His final work after his death in 1975.

References

External links 
 Al Perkins on Library Thing

1904 births
1975 deaths
American children's writers
Writers from New York City